Alexander Mavhiko (born 30 October 1984) is a Zimbabwean cricketer. He made his List A debut for Midlands cricket team on 5 February 2006.

References

External links
 

1984 births
Living people
Zimbabwean cricketers
Centrals cricketers
Midlands cricketers
Mid West Rhinos cricketers